L'Abbé may refer to:

Toponyms

Canada 
Abbé Huard Lake, Côte-Nord, Quebec
Abbé Huard River, tributary of the Romaine River in Côte-Nord, Quebec
Ruisseau L'Abbé, tributary of the Pikauba River in Lac-Ministuk, Le Fjord-du-Saguenay, Quebec

France 
Buigny-l'Abbé, in the Somme department
Camblain-l'Abbé, in the Pas-de-Calais department
Fontaine-l'Abbé, in the Eure department
Hesdin-l'Abbé, in the Pas-de-Calais department
Méricourt-l'Abbé, in the Somme department
Pont-l'Abbé ("Abbot's bridge"), in the Finistère department
Pont-l'Abbé-d'Arnoult, in the Charente-Maritime department
Stade de l'Abbé-Deschamps, a stadium in Auxerre

Jersey 
Vingtaine du Mont à l'Abbé, one of six vingtaines of the Parish of Saint Helier

Other uses 
L'Abbé C, Georges Bataille's 1950 first published novella
 Abbe (name), including people with the name L'Abbe

See also